The International Journal of Computer Processing of Languages is a peer-reviewed academic journal established in 1983 as the International Journal of Computer Processing of Oriental Languages. It was published by World Scientific and covers research in various forms of human communication - visual, graphical, sign and textual, also considering cultural and application differences. Some areas include computational linguistics, information extraction and retrieval, as well as sign and graphical languages processing. As of 2009, the editor-in-chief was Kam-Fai Wong (Chinese University of Hong Kong).

The journal ceased publication in June 2012 with Volume 24 Issue 2.

Abstracting and indexing 
The journal is abstracted and indexed in Inspec and Linguistics and Language Behavior Abstracts.

References

External links 
 

World Scientific academic journals
Computer science journals
English-language journals
Publications established in 1983
Publications disestablished in 2012
Quarterly journals